Parween Pazhwak (born in 1967 in Kabul) is an Afghan artist from Afghanistan and a modern poet and writer of the Persian language.

Biography
Parween Pazhwak was born to the Pazhwak literary and political family, her father and mother being Ne'matulla Pazhwak and Afifah Pazhwak, respectively. She is the granddaughter of Abdul Rahman Pazhwak.

Pazhwak went to the French-taught Malalai school and completed studying medicine in the Avicenna Medical Institute. Following the Soviet Union's invasion of Afghanistan, she spent two years in Pakistan as a transit refugee before moving to Canada as an asylum seeker. She lives in Ontario together with her husband and children.

Pazhwak considers the best time in her life to be her days as a student and life in exile to be among her most difficult times. Her works of literature include modern Persian poetry, short stories, and paintings for children. She has created eleven works of art. Two of her most famous published books are Darya dar Shabnam (Oceans in Dew) and  Negin-ha wa Setara-ha (Gems and Stars).

References

Sources
 R M Chopra, "Eminent Poetesses of Persian", Iran Society, Kolkata, 2010

Pazhwak, Parwin
Pazhwak, Parwin
Pazhwak, Parwin
Pazhwak, Parwin
Pazhwak, Parwin
Pazhwak, Parwin
Pashtun women
Afghan women poets
People from Kabul
Afghan emigrants to Canada
Persian-language women poets
Canadian people of Pashtun descent
21st-century Persian-language writers
21st-century Afghan poets